Richard Lamar Dent (born December 13, 1960) is an American former professional football player who was a defensive end in the National Football League (NFL), primarily for the Chicago Bears. He was the MVP of Super Bowl XX. He was elected to the Pro Football Hall of Fame in 2011.

Pro football career

Chicago Bears
After graduating in 1983 and playing four years at Tennessee State University, Dent was drafted in the eighth round by the Bears, with 203rd overall pick in the 1983 NFL Draft. At 6 ft 5 in, Dent was a great pass rusher who beat offensive tackles with his speed, and thrived in defensive coordinator Buddy Ryan's aggressive 46 defense. He was part of the core of great players who made the Bears' defenses of the 1980s legendary. Between 1984 and 1985, Dent recorded 34.5 sacks, while recording a then team-record 17.5 sacks in the former season.

1985 season

When the Bears went on to defeat the New England Patriots in a 46-10 landslide in Super Bowl XX, Dent was selected as the game's MVP. During the game, he shared 1.5 sacks, forced two fumbles, and blocked a pass. Dent made a mere $90,000 in base salary for his efforts in 1985. ($173,000 in 2007 dollars and just over $192,000 in 2012 dollars). He was a featured soloist of the "Shuffling Crew" in the video, the "Super Bowl Shuffle" in 1985.

After Chicago
Dent would remain with the team until the end of the 1993 season, after the Bears had won just one playoff game since their loss to the San Francisco 49ers in the 1988 NFC Championship Game, and head coach Mike Ditka had been replaced by Dave Wannstedt.

Dent won another Super Bowl ring after spending the 1994 season under contract with the 49ers, though he spent almost the whole year injured. Injuries would continue to hamper Dent after his return to Chicago in 1995. He would spend 1996 and 1997 with the Indianapolis Colts and Philadelphia Eagles, respectively, playing the so-called designated pass rusher for them.

Dent retired after the 1997 season. His lifetime statistics included 137.5 sacks and eight interceptions; he returned these picks for 89 yards and one touchdown. He also recovered 13 fumbles, returning them for 56 yards and one touchdown. He had 124.5 sacks during his first stint with the Bears, from 1983 to 1993. At the time of his retirement, his 137.5 sacks ranked him third in NFL history behind Reggie White and Bruce Smith.

Post-retirement

During Super Bowl XLIV, Dent joined other members of the 1985 Chicago Bears in resurrecting the "Super Bowl Shuffle" in a Boost Mobile commercial.

Dent was nominated numerous times for the Pro Football Hall of Fame and in 2005-2009 he was among the top 15 finalists in the selection process. After several years of unsuccessful nominations, he was finally selected for enshrinement in the Pro Football Hall of Fame in Canton, Ohio on February 5, 2011. His induction speech was notable for omitting any mention of both Ditka and Ryan. Since his retirement Dent has had a difficult relationship with Ditka because he publicly blamed Ditka for the Bears' inability to repeat as Super Bowl champions. In a 2012 interview on WSCR, Dent argued that the Bears would have won at least three Super Bowls if they had been able to find any consistency at quarterback.

In addition to the Pro Football Hall of Fame, Dent was also inducted into the Georgia Sports Hall of Fame in 2008 and the Black College Football Hall of Fame in 2015.

Personal life
According to a DNA analysis, he descended, mainly, from Mende people of Sierra Leone and Balanta people of Guinea Bissau. He is the godfather of football player Ahmaad Smith.

Richard lives in Chicago and has four children: Mary, Sarah, R.J., and Shiloh. His son R.J., is a football player that plays for Stevenson High School.

References

1960 births
Living people
100 Sacks Club
African-American players of American football
American football defensive ends
American people of Mende descent
Chicago Bears coaches
Chicago Bears players
Indianapolis Colts players
National Conference Pro Bowl players
Philadelphia Eagles players
Players of American football from Atlanta
Players of American football from Chicago
Pro Football Hall of Fame inductees
San Francisco 49ers players
Super Bowl MVPs
Tennessee State Tigers football players